Keir is  a given name and surname of Gaelic and Scottish origin. 

Keir or KEIR may also refer to:
 Keir, Dumfries and Galloway, Scotland, a civil parish
 Keir House, Stirling, Scotland
 KNBL, a radio station (1260 AM) licensed to serve Idaho Falls, Idaho, United States, which held the call sign KEIR from 2014 to 2018

See also
 
 
 Kier (disambiguation)